"Speed of Sound" is a song by British rock band Coldplay. It was written by all members of the band for their third studio album, X&Y (2005). Constructed around a piano and guitar riff, the song builds into a huge, synthesiser-heavy chorus. It was released by Parlophone Records as the lead single from the album. "Speed of Sound" made its radio premiere on BBC Radio 1 with Lamacq on 19 April, then was serviced to US radio on 25 April 2005. The song was released in the UK on 23 May with two B-sides: "Things I Don't Understand" and "Proof".

Coldplay vocalist Chris Martin admitted that the song was developed after the band had listened to English art rock singer Kate Bush. Upon the song's release, it charted in the UK Singles Chart in the number two position. In the United States, it debuted at number eight on the Billboard Hot 100, their first top ten hit in the country, and their most successful song until "Viva la Vida" reached number one in 2008.

"Speed of Sound" was recognised Song of the Year by the American Society of Composers, Authors and Publishers (ASCAP) and it was nominated twice at the 48th Grammy Awards. The song won a Brit Award in the category for Best British Single in 2006. The track's music video was nominated for four MTV Video Music Awards. "Speed of Sound" was also notable as the billionth download from the iTunes Store.

Background
In an interview, Coldplay vocalist Chris Martin revealed that the song was written in mid-2004 and was inspired by Martin's daughter, Apple, and English alternative rock singer Kate Bush: "That's a song where we were listening to a lot of Kate Bush last summer, and we wanted a song which had a lot of tom-toms in it. I just had my daughter up also, and was kind of feeling in a sense of awe and wonderment, so the song is kind of a Kate Bush song about miracles." The drumbeat of the song was inspired by Bush's 1985 song "Running Up that Hill". In a separate interview, bassist Guy Berryman said: "We were really trying to recreate the drums on that song for this song, and the chords. Some bands are reluctant to admit that they take things from other artists and bands that they listen to and we're shameless in that respect, we don't mind telling."

The band's opinion towards the song, however, has soured. Martin has said that he dislikes "Speed of Sound", saying in a 2011 interview, "We never got it right." During an interview with Howard Stern, Martin said that his dislike of "Speed of Sound" stems from the fact that he "forgot the banana lyric for the song. A banana lyric is a staple in every song we've made and somehow I forgot to write one for Speed of Sound." Due to this, Martin is reluctant to perform the song live, citing his feelings towards the song, noting that "an audience can pick up real fast if something is clearly missing."

Composition

"Speed of Sound" is a piano-based song with an upbeat tempo. The song begins with the insistently ornate keyboard melody,
with a backing synthesizer that is heard throughout the song. The melody then transitions into the first verse being sung by lead singer Chris Martin. It repeats, with the song then transitioning into its second verse. The verses of song feature the rest of the band as the song continues to build. It then climaxes with the anthemic chorus, which features a huge roar of instrumentation that includes electric and bass guitars, drums, and synthesizers. The song then ends with the chorus and its grandiose sound. "Speed of Sound" is written in the key of A Mixolydian.

The lyrics in the song are cryptic. The ending lines of the chorus emphasise belief and assurance: "If you could see it then you'd understand/Ah, when you see it then you'll understand." This belief is restated in the third verse: "Some things you have to believe/others are puzzles puzzling me." The fourth line in the second verse alludes to discovering one's place in the world: "How long am I gonna stand/with my head stuck under the sand."

In his review of X&Y, Bill White of the Seattle Post-Intelligencer newspaper noted that the "slowing ... creative juices" evident in "Speed of Sound" compare to "melodies from both Jeff Buckley ('Last Goodbye') and Keane ('Everybody's Changing')".

Release and critical reception
Coldplay released "Speed of Sound" in the US on 25 April 2005 and in the UK on 23 May 2005 as the album's lead single. The single was pressed with two B-sides: "Things I Don't Understand" and "Proof".

The song was met with a polarised response from critics. PopMatters felt that the song "comes close to sounding too safe, almost like the band is on autopilot." Several critics felt that the song resembled Coldplay's earlier single "Clocks". MusicOMH commented that "Speed Of Sound, the lead single, has 'Clocks'-like drumming contrasts with synth sequences that remind more of Enya than rock music" and criticised it for sounding "familiar and far older than it is." Pitchfork Media likewise criticised the song's "uncanny resemblance to 'Clocks'" and continued "Certainly, it rarely hurts to stick with what works, but this is not just a near-exact replica of its successful predecessor; it's also a less memorable song riding a piano hook that has so deeply infiltrated the pop-culture landscape that I've become numb to it." The reviewer did, however, comment that "the track's vocal melody outperforms the one from 'Clocks' by a hair."

The Village Voice felt that the song was "unusually accomplished, fresh, and emotional." Paste Magazine praised the song, saying that it "reveals the hand [Coldplay are] playing: a piano riff as memorable as the one in 'Clocks,' ringing guitars, martial drums, orchestral pomp and, in the center, Chris Martin's keening vocal, so vulnerable and yet forceful enough to stand out from the mass of sonic detail." The New York Times, contrariwise, dinged X&Y for "trying to carry beauty of 'Clocks' across an entire album – not least in its first single, 'Speed of Sound,' which isn't the only song on the album to borrow the 'Clocks' drumbeat." Rolling Stone magazine gave a mixed review, calling it "an appealing but not thrilling song" and noted "...it sounds a bit like...'Clocks' but without the swagger." Blender included the track on their "Songs of the Year 2005" list at number 16.

Chart performance
"Speed of Sound" was beaten to the number one spot on the UK Singles Chart by the novelty song "Axel F" by the Crazy Frog, instead peaking at number two for a week, although it did stay in the Top 75 for sixteen non-consecutive weeks. However, it became Coldplay's first UK download number one.

It also became Coldplay's first and (at that point) biggest single to chart in the top 10 of the Billboard Hot 100, debuting as well as peaking at number eight, making it the band's most successful single until "Viva la Vida" reached number one in 2008. The single marked the first time a British band entered directly in the top 10 of the Billboard Hot 100 chart since "Say You'll Be There" by the Spice Girls. The song was also the billionth song downloaded from Apple, Inc.'s iTunes Store. A ringtone was available from Cingular Wireless, which had a song clip from "Speed of Sound" available a week before it was heard on radio. The song was also included in "Weird Al" Yankovic's polka medley "Polkarama!" from his 2006 album  Straight Outta Lynwood.

Accolades
"Speed of Sound" was nominated for two Grammy Awards in the categories of Best Rock Song and Best Rock Performance by a Duo or Group with Vocals at the 2006 Grammy Awards. It won a MTV Europe Music Award for Best Song as well. In December 2005, the track appeared at number nine on Q magazine's "100 Greatest Tracks of the Year". In 2006, it won a Brit Award for Best British Single. The year also saw the American Society of Composers, Authors and Publishers (ASCAP) naming "Speed of Sound" their Song of the Year.

Music video

Production

The video promo for "Speed of Sound" was shot on a Los Angeles sound stage on 22 and 23 April 2005. Shooting took place on large sets backed by large Light-emitting diode (LED) displays developed by Element Labs. The performance-based video was directed by Mark Romanek. The video features the band performing in front of a curved ellipse wall that consists of 640 Element Labs' VersaTubes placed on  centres.

The on-set animations were programmed and performed live during the shoot. Romanek wanted the song's stem "split out" and to have the drums, bass, guitar, and vocals on separate tracks, which were then animated, and the lights were synthesised to each of the tracks. In the end, Romanek and Michael Keeling, the lighting designer, opted to use Chris Martin's vocal track to animate "because it had such dynamics. Roughly 75% of the video is driven by voice-activated animation", said Keeling.

Video
The video opens in pitch-black, followed by a light framing Martin as he reaches skyward out of the shadows. The scene then shifts to the band, as they play the song. When Martin spread his hands, the two-storey-high LED lights erupt in a colour of rainbow hues. The LED background changes colours as the band continues. The video concludes its ending with the band lined up, one-by-one, and the LED set displaying a white light background.

The video debuted on 23 May 2005 and proved successful on video-chart programs. It debuted on 11 June 2005 on Fuse's No. 1 Countdown Rock, at number six, and retired on 5 August at number seven of the countdown. It also reached number sixteen in MuchMusic's Countdown a month after its debut. At the 2005 MTV Video Music Awards, the video garnered nominations in the categories of Video of the Year, Best Special Effects, Best Editing, and Best Cinematography. The video was the ranked at number 10 on VH1's Top 40 of 2005.

Personnel
 Chris Martin – lead vocals, piano, synthesizer
 Jonny Buckland – electric guitar
 Guy Berryman – bass guitar, backing vocals
 Will Champion – drums, backing vocals

Track listing

UK CD , 7" , 12" , 10" 
Australia CD  released 23 May 2005 by Capitol Records
Japan CD  released 11 May 2005 by Toshiba-EMI

Charts

Weekly charts

Year-end charts

Certifications

Release history

References

2005 singles
Brit Award for British Single
Coldplay songs
Music videos directed by Mark Romanek
Number-one singles in Italy
Parlophone singles
Songs written by Chris Martin
Songs written by Guy Berryman
Songs written by Jonny Buckland
Songs written by Will Champion
Song recordings produced by Ken Nelson (British record producer)
2005 songs